The Benewah County Courthouse is a building located in St. Maries, Idaho listed on the National Register of Historic Places.

It is a three-story building which is brick on two sides and brick veneer on two others.  It has a terra cotta entry surround including a bas relief rosette design.  The building has a denticulated terra cotta cornice.

It was designed by Spokane architect Julius Zittel and built by Spokane contractors Meyers and Telender.

See also

 List of National Historic Landmarks in Idaho
 National Register of Historic Places listings in Benewah County, Idaho

References

External links
 

1924 establishments in Idaho
Buildings and structures in Benewah County, Idaho
Courthouses on the National Register of Historic Places in Idaho
Government buildings completed in 1924
Neoclassical architecture in Idaho
National Register of Historic Places in Benewah County, Idaho